Naughty, Naughty! is a 1918 American silent comedy film starring Enid Bennett and written by C. Gardner Sullivan. The film's protagonist is Roberta Miller, an innocent girl who leaves her rural hometown for the big city. She returns after four months, but her sophistication draws suspicion in her hometown.

Plot
As described in a film magazine, Roberta Miller (Bennett) returns to Lilyville, Kansas, after spending one season in New York City and finds things dull. Her many trunks, bulldog, and much finery cause the gossips' tongues to wag and she finally brings down the wrath of the church-going populous when she presents a "Symphony of Spring" at a bazaar in the town hall that consists of a nature dance with music and little clothing. The town is divided on the question of dancing thereafter and she proceeds to convert the "antis" by luring an innocent young woman to a nearby town's dance hall, intending to leave her there while informing the church people. However, at the dance hall she discovers a church trustee and changes her plan. On the recommendation of the trustee and the editor of the local paper, Matthew Sampson (Rodney), the church votes to have dancing to save the young people from temptation. Roberta, out of gratitude, agrees to marry the newspaper editor.

Cast
 Enid Bennett as Roberta Miller
 Earle Rodney as Matthew Sampson
 Marjorie Bennett as Prudence Sampson
 Gloria Hope as Judith Holmes
 Andrew Arbuckle as Adam Miller

References

External links

1918 films
American silent feature films
American black-and-white films
1918 comedy films
Silent American comedy films
Films set in Kansas
Films directed by Jerome Storm
1910s American films